River Jude Phoenix (August 23, 1970 – October 31, 1993) was an American actor, singer, musician , songwriter and activist.

Phoenix grew up in an itinerant family, as the older brother of Rain Phoenix, Joaquin Phoenix, Liberty Phoenix, and Summer Phoenix. He had no formal schooling, but showed an instinctive talent for the guitar. He began his acting career at age 10 in television commercials. He starred in the science fiction adventure film Explorers (1985) and had his first notable role in 1986's Stand by Me, a coming-of-age film based on the novella The Body by Stephen King. Phoenix made a transition into more adult-oriented roles with Running on Empty (1988), playing Danny Pope, the son of fugitive parents in a well-received performance that earned him a nomination for an Academy Award for Best Supporting Actor (at age 18, he became the sixth-youngest nominee in the category), and My Own Private Idaho (1991), playing Michael Waters, a gay hustler in search of his estranged mother. For his performance in the latter, Phoenix garnered enormous praise and won a Volpi Cup for Best Actor at the 1991 Venice Film Festival as well as Independent Spirit Award for Best Male Lead and National Society of Film Critics Award for Best Actor, becoming the second-youngest winner of the former.

Phoenix died at age 23 from combined drug intoxication in West Hollywood in the early hours of Halloween, 1993, having overdosed on cocaine and heroin (a mixture commonly known as speedball) at The Viper Room.

Early life
Phoenix was born on August 23, 1970, in Madras, Oregon, the first child of Arlyn Dunetz and John Lee Bottom. He has four younger siblings, Rain (born 1972), Joaquin (born 1974), Liberty (born 1976) and Summer (born 1978), as well as two paternal half-siblings, Jodean (born 1964) and Hope (born  2009). Phoenix's parents named him after the river of life from the Hermann Hesse novel Siddhartha, and he received his middle name from the Beatles' song "Hey Jude". In an interview with People, Phoenix described his parents as "hippieish". His mother was born in New York to Jewish parents whose families had emigrated from Russia and Hungary. His father was a lapsed Catholic from Fontana, California, of English, German, and French ancestry. In 1968, Phoenix's mother travelled across the United States. While hitchhiking in California she met John Lee Bottom. They married on September 13, 1969, less than a year after meeting.

Phoenix's family moved cross country when he was very young. Phoenix has stated that they lived in a "desperate situation." Phoenix often played guitar while he and his sister sang on street corners for money and food to support their ever-growing family. Phoenix never attended formal school. Screenwriter Naomi Foner later commented, "He was totally, totally without education. I mean, he could read and write, and he had an appetite for it, but he had no deep roots into any kind of sense of history or literature." George Sluizer claimed Phoenix was dyslexic.

Children of God and child sexual abuse 

In 1973, the family joined the religious organization known as the Children of God. His family settled in Caracas, Venezuela, where the Children of God had stationed them to work as missionaries and fruit gatherers. According to Vanity Fair, Phoenix was raped at the age of four. In an interview with Details magazine in November 1991, Phoenix stated he lost his virginity at age four to other children while in the Children of God, but he had "blocked it out". Although Phoenix rarely talked about the cult, he was quoted in an article published in Esquire in 1994 as having said, "They're disgusting, they're ruining people's lives." In 2019, his brother Joaquin would claim that River was joking, saying, "It was a complete and total joke. It was just fucking with the press. It was literally a joke, because he was so tired of being asked ridiculous questions by the press." Arlyn and John eventually grew disillusioned with the "Church" and left the cult in 1977. In the aforementioned interview with Details magazine, Phoenix said he was "completely celibate" between the ages of ten and fourteen.

Acting career

1980–1985: Early work and acting background 

Back in the United States, Arlyn began working as a secretary for an NBC broadcaster and John as an exteriors architect. Talent agent Iris Burton spotted River, Joaquin, and their sisters Summer and Rain singing for spare change in Westwood, Los Angeles, and was so charmed by the family that she soon represented the four siblings.

Phoenix started doing commercials for Mitsubishi, Ocean Spray, and Saks Fifth Avenue, and soon afterward he and the other children were signed by Paramount Pictures casting director Penny Marshall. River and Rain were assigned immediately to a show called Real Kids as audience warm-up performers. In 1980, Phoenix began to fully pursue his career as an actor, making his first appearance on a TV show called Fantasy singing with his sister Rain. In 1982, Phoenix was cast in the short-lived CBS television series, Seven Brides for Seven Brothers, in which he starred as youngest brother Guthrie McFadden. Phoenix arrived at the auditions with his guitar and promptly burst into a convincing Elvis Presley impersonation, charming the show producer. By this age, Phoenix was also an accomplished tap dancer.

Almost a year after Seven Brides ended in 1983, Phoenix found a new role in the 1984 television movie Celebrity, in which he played the part of young Jeffie Crawford. Although only onscreen for about ten minutes, his character was central. Less than a month after Celebrity came the ABC Afterschool Special: Backwards: The Riddle of Dyslexia. Phoenix starred as a young boy who discovers he has dyslexia. Joaquin starred in a small role alongside his brother. In September, the pilot episode of short-lived TV series It's Your Move aired. Phoenix was cast as Brian and only had one line of dialogue. He also starred as Robert Kennedy's son, Robert F. Kennedy Jr., in the TV movie Robert Kennedy and His Times. After his role in Dyslexia was critically acclaimed, Phoenix was almost immediately cast in a major role in made-for-TV movie Surviving: A Family in Crisis. He starred as Philip Brogan alongside Molly Ringwald and Heather O'Rourke. Halfway through the filming of Surviving, Iris Burton contacted him about a possible role in the film Explorers.

In October 1984, Phoenix secured the role of geeky boy-scientist Wolfgang Müller in Joe Dante's big-budget science-fiction film Explorers alongside Ethan Hawke, and production began soon after. Released in the summer of 1985, this was Phoenix's first major motion picture role. In October 1986, Phoenix co-starred alongside Tuesday Weld and Geraldine Fitzgerald in the acclaimed CBS television movie Circle of Violence: A Family Drama, which told a story of domestic elder abuse. This was Phoenix's last television role before achieving film stardom.

1986–1993: Critical success in Stand by Me, Running on Empty, My Own Private Idaho

Phoenix had a significant role in Rob Reiner's popular coming-of-age film Stand by Me (1986), which made him a household name at 16. Filming started on June 17, 1985, and ended in late August 1985, making Phoenix 14 for most (if not all) of the movie. The Washington Post opined that Phoenix gave the film its "centre of gravity". Phoenix commented: "The truth is, I identified so much with the role of Chris Chambers that if I hadn't had my family to go back to after the shoot, I'd have probably had to see a psychiatrist." Later that year, Phoenix completed Peter Weir's The Mosquito Coast (1986), playing the son of Harrison Ford and Helen Mirren's characters. "He was obviously going to be a movie star," observed Weir. "It's something apart from acting ability. Laurence Olivier never had what River had." During the five-month shoot in Belize, Phoenix began a romance with co-star Martha Plimpton, a relationship which continued in some form for many years. Phoenix was surprised by the poor reception for the film, feeling more secure about his work in it than he had in Stand by Me. 

Phoenix was next cast as the lead in the teen comedy-drama A Night in the Life of Jimmy Reardon (1988), but was disappointed with his performance: "It didn't turn out the way I thought it would, and I put the blame on myself. I wanted to do a comedy, and it was definitely a stretch, but I'm not sure I was even the right person for the role." Also in 1988, Phoenix starred in Little Nikita alongside Sidney Poitier. During this time, the Phoenix family continued to move on a regular basis, relocating over forty times by the time Phoenix was 18. Phoenix purchased his family a ranch in Micanopy, Florida, near Gainesville, in 1987, in addition to a spread in Costa Rica.

His sixth feature film was Sidney Lumet's Running on Empty (1988), for which the 18-year-old Phoenix received National Board of Review Award for Best Supporting Actor and nominations for a Golden Globe Award and an Academy Award, becoming the sixth-youngest Academy Award nominee in the category. Phoenix jumped to his feet during the ceremony when Kevin Kline beat him to the Oscar. "I had to stop River from running to hug Kevin," recalled his mother Arlyn. "It never crossed his mind that he hadn't won." In 1989, he portrayed a young Indiana Jones in the box-office hit Indiana Jones and the Last Crusade directed by Steven Spielberg.

Phoenix was photographed by Bruce Weber for Vogue and was spokesperson for a campaign for Gap in 1990. He starred with Kevin Kline, Tracey Ullman, Joan Plowright and Keanu Reeves in the 1990 comedy film I Love You to Death. Phoenix had met Reeves while Reeves was filming the 1989 film Parenthood with Phoenix's brother, Joaquin, and girlfriend, Martha Plimpton; however, Phoenix had reportedly auditioned for Bill in Reeves' then-current film Bill & Ted's Excellent Adventure before the role was taken by Alex Winter.

He co-starred with Lili Taylor in the acclaimed independent picture Dogfight (1991), directed by Nancy Savoca. In the romantic coming-of-age drama set in San Francisco, Phoenix portrayed a young U.S. Marine on the night before he is shipped off to Vietnam in November 1963. Taylor remarked that Phoenix suffered because he could not distance himself from his character: "He also hadn't gotten into any [drugs] – he was just drinking then, too. It was different ... That was actually a hard part for him, because it was so radically different from who he was. He was such a hippie, and here he was playing this marine. It actually caused him a lot of discomfort. I don't think he enjoyed that, actually, getting into that psyche."

Phoenix reunited with Keanu Reeves to co-star in Gus Van Sant's 1991 avant-garde film My Own Private Idaho. In his review for Newsweek, David Ansen praised Phoenix's performance as gay hustler Michael Waters: "The campfire scene in which Mike awkwardly declares his unrequited love for Scott is a marvel of delicacy. In this, and every scene, Phoenix immerses himself so deeply inside his character you almost forget you've seen him before: it's a stunningly sensitive performance, poignant and comic at once". He won the Volpi Cup for Best Actor at the 1991 Venice Film Festival. In addition, the 21-year-old Phoenix received Independent Spirit Award for Best Male Lead and National Society of Film Critics Award for Best Actor, becoming the second-youngest winner of the former. His critically acclaimed performance helped bring queer cinema to a mainstream audience. The film and its success solidified his image as an actor with edgy, leading man potential. In that period, Phoenix was beginning to use marijuana, cocaine and heroin with some friends.

He teamed up with Robert Redford and again with Sidney Poitier for the conspiracy/espionage thriller Sneakers (1992). A month later, he began production on Sam Shepard's art-house ghost western Silent Tongue (which was released in 1994). He was beaten out for the role of Paul by Brad Pitt in A River Runs Through It. Phoenix then starred in Peter Bogdanovich's country music-themed film, The Thing Called Love (1993), the last completed picture before his death. He began a relationship with co-star Samantha Mathis on the set.

Unreleased and unfilmed projects
Phoenix's sudden death prevented him from playing various roles:
Phoenix was due to begin work on Neil Jordan's Interview with the Vampire (1994) two weeks after his death. He was to play the part of Daniel Molloy, the interviewer, which then went to Christian Slater, who donated his entire $250,000 salary to two of Phoenix's favorite charitable organizations: Earth Save and Earth Trust. The film has a dedication to Phoenix after the end credits.
The Guardian suggested in 2003 "it was likely that Phoenix would have followed Interview with the Vampire by appearing as Susan Sarandon's son in Safe Passage (1994), a role that went to Sean Astin. 
 Phoenix had signed onto the lead role in Broken Dreams, a screenplay written by John Boorman and Neil Jordan (to be directed by Boorman), and co-starring Winona Ryder. The film was put on hold due to Phoenix's death. In June 2012, it was announced that Caleb Landry Jones had been cast in the role. 
 Gus Van Sant had persuaded Phoenix to agree to play the role of Cleve Jones in Milk when he was originally planning on making the movie in the early 1990s. The role was eventually played by Emile Hirsch in 2008.
 When Gus Van Sant was asked in Interview magazine, "You were going to do a movie with River about Andy Warhol, right?", he said, "Yeah. River kind of looked like Andy in his younger days. But that project never really went forward."
In 1988, Phoenix was reportedly carrying around a copy of the 1978 memoir The Basketball Diaries. He had heard a movie version was in the works and wanted to play the autobiographical role of Jim Carroll. The film was sent into hiatus on numerous occasions with Phoenix being cited as the main contender for the role each time. The Basketball Diaries was made in 1995 with 19-year-old Leonardo DiCaprio in the lead.
He had expressed interest in playing the 19th-century poet Arthur Rimbaud in Total Eclipse (1995) by Polish director Agnieszka Holland. Phoenix died before the movie was cast, with the role eventually going to Leonardo DiCaprio.
Phoenix was James Cameron's original choice to play Jack Dawson in Titanic (1997), with the role ultimately going to Leonardo DiCaprio.

Music

Although Phoenix's movie career was generating most of the income for his family, it has been stated by close friends and relatives that his true passion was music. Phoenix was a singer, songwriter, and accomplished guitarist. He had begun teaching himself guitar at age five and had stated in an interview for E! in 1988 that his family's move to Los Angeles when he was nine was so that he and his sister "could become recording artists. I fell into commercials for financial reasons and acting became an attractive concept". Before securing an acting agent, Phoenix and his siblings tried to forge a career in music by playing cover versions on the streets of the Westwood district of LA, often being moved along by police because gathering crowds would obstruct the sidewalk. From the first fruits of his film success, Phoenix saved $650 to obtain his prized possession: a guitar with which he wrote what he described as "progressive, ethereal folk-rock".

While working on A Night in the Life of Jimmy Reardon in 1986, Phoenix had written and recorded a song, "Heart to Get", specifically for the end credits of the movie. 20th Century Fox cut it from the completed film, but director William Richert put it back into place for his director's cut some years later. It was during filming that Phoenix met Chris Blackwell of Island Records; this meeting would later secure Phoenix a two-year development deal with the label. Phoenix disliked the idea of being a solo artist and relished collaboration; therefore he focused on putting together a band. Aleka's Attic were formed in 1987 and the lineup included his sister Rain.

Phoenix was committed to gaining credibility by his own merit and maintained that the band would not use his name when securing performances that were not benefits for charitable organizations. Phoenix's first release was "Across the Way", co-written with bandmate Josh McKay, which was released in 1989 on a benefit album for PETA titled Tame Yourself. In 1991, Phoenix wrote and recorded a spoken word piece called "Curi Curi" for Milton Nascimento's album TXAI. Also in 1991, the Aleka's Attic track "Too Many Colors" was used in the film My Own Private Idaho, which included Phoenix in a starring role.

Aleka's Attic disbanded in 1992, but Phoenix continued writing and performing. While working on the film The Thing Called Love in 1993, Phoenix wrote and recorded the song "Lone Star State of Mine", which he performs in the movie. The song was not included on the film's soundtrack album. In 1996, the Aleka's Attic track "Note to a Friend" was released on the 1996 benefit album In Defense of Animals; Volume II and featured Flea of Red Hot Chili Peppers on bass. Phoenix had collaborated with friend John Frusciante after his first departure from Red Hot Chili Peppers and the songs "Height Down" and "Well I've Been" were released on Frusciante's second solo album Smile from the Streets You Hold in 1997. Phoenix was an investor in the original House of Blues (founded by his good friend and Sneakers co-star Dan Aykroyd) in Cambridge, Massachusetts, which opened its doors to the public after serving a group of homeless people on Thanksgiving Day 1992.

Activism
Phoenix was a dedicated animal rights and environmental activist. He was a vegan from the age of seven. He was a prominent spokesperson for PETA and won their Humanitarian Award in 1992 for his fund-raising efforts. His first girlfriend Martha Plimpton recalled: "Once when we were fifteen, River and I went out for a fancy dinner in Manhattan, and I ordered soft-shell crabs. He left the restaurant and walked around on Park Avenue, crying. I went out and he said, 'I love you so much, why? ... ' He had such pain that I was eating an animal, that he hadn't impressed on me what was right."

In 1990, Phoenix wrote an environmental awareness essay about Earth Day targeted at his young fan base, which was printed in Seventeen magazine. He financially aided a great many environmental and humanitarian organizations, and bought  of endangered rainforest in Costa Rica. As well as giving speeches at rallies for various groups, Phoenix and his band often played environmental benefits for well-known charities as well as local ones in the Gainesville, Florida area.

He campaigned for Bill Clinton in the 1992 US presidential election.

Personal life
In February 1986, during the filming of The Mosquito Coast, Phoenix began a romance with his co-star Martha Plimpton. They had met a year earlier but initially disliked one another. They also co-starred in the 1988 film Running on Empty before the relationship ended in June 1989 due to Phoenix's drug use. The two maintained a close friendship until his death. Plimpton later stated, "When we split up, a lot of it was that I had learned that screaming, fighting, and begging wasn't going to change him. He had to change himself, and he didn't want to yet."

A roman à clef Pink by director Gus Van Sant asserts that Phoenix was not a regular drug user but only an occasional one, and that the actor had a more serious problem with alcohol. Phoenix had always tried to hide his addictions because he feared that they might ruin his career as they did his relationship with Plimpton.

For the last year of his life, in 1993, he dated his The Thing Called Love co-star Samantha Mathis. Mathis was with Phoenix on the night he died.

Death 

In late October 1993, Phoenix had returned to Los Angeles after flying back from one week in New Mexico. Before that, he had spent six to seven weeks in Utah to complete the three weeks of interior shots left on his last project, Dark Blood. The film was finally completed in 2012.

In his book Running with Monsters Bob Forrest wrote that Phoenix spent the days preceding his death on a drug binge with John Frusciante from the Red Hot Chili Peppers. Phoenix and John Frusciante were consuming cocaine and heroin and had not slept for several days.
 
On the evening of October 30, 1993, Phoenix arrived at The Viper Room, a Hollywood nightclub partly owned by Johnny Depp, with his girlfriend Samantha Mathis and his brother Joaquin and sister Rain. Phoenix was to perform with the band P. The band featured Phoenix's friends Flea and John Frusciante from the Red Hot Chili Peppers, Gibby Haynes of the Butthole Surfers, Al Jourgensen of Ministry, and Depp.

According to Bob Forrest, during the performance by P, Phoenix tapped him on the shoulder to tell him he was not feeling well and that he thought he had overdosed. Forrest said to Phoenix that he did not think that he was overdosing because he could stand and talk. Nonetheless, he offered to take Phoenix home, but the latter declined, saying he was feeling better. A few moments later, Forrest said that a commotion erupted in the club and he went outside to find Mathis screaming as her boyfriend was lying on the sidewalk having convulsions. Unable to determine whether Phoenix was breathing, Joaquin called 911. Rain proceeded to give Phoenix mouth-to-mouth resuscitation.

According to Gibby Haynes, the band was performing their song "Michael Stipe" while Phoenix was outside the venue having seizures on the sidewalk. When the news filtered through the club, Flea left the stage and rushed outside. By that time, paramedics had arrived on the scene and found Phoenix turning cyanotic, suffering from cardiac arrest, and asystolic. They administered medication in an attempt to restart his heart.

When the ambulance arrived, Phoenix was still alive, and Flea accompanied him to Cedars-Sinai Medical Center. Attempts to resuscitate Phoenix at the hospital were unsuccessful. He was pronounced dead at 1:51 a.m. PST on the morning of October 31, 1993, at the age of 23.

Aftermath
Years later, Samantha Mathis said that during her relationship with Phoenix, she had known him to be sober. However, Mathis added that in the moments immediately prior to his death, she "knew something was going on". Mathis added, "I didn't see anyone doing drugs [that night] but he was high in a way that made me feel uncomfortable". She added that "the heroin that killed him didn't happen until he was in the Viper Room". Mathis went to the restroom, and on her way back to the table, she saw Phoenix scuffling with another man. The bouncers removed both men from the club. Mathis shouted at the other man, "What have you done? What are you on?" Another person responded, "Leave him alone, you're spoiling his high." By that time, Phoenix had fallen to the ground and begun to convulse.

Following Phoenix's death, the club became a makeshift shrine, with fans and mourners leaving flowers, pictures and candles on the sidewalk, as well as graffiti messages on the walls of the venue. A sign was placed in the window that read, "With much respect and love to River and his family, The Viper Room is temporarily closed. Our heartfelt condolences to all his family, friends and loved ones. He will be missed." The club remained closed for a week. Depp continued to close the club every year on October 31 until selling his share in 2004.

The autopsy report, finalized on November 15, 1993, stated that there were "high concentrations of morphine and cocaine in the blood, as well as other substances in smaller concentrations." The cause of death was "acute multiple drug intoxication".

On November 24, 1993, Arlyn (who later changed her name to Heart) Phoenix published an open letter in the Los Angeles Times on her son's life and death. It read, in part:

Before his death, Phoenix's image—one he bemoaned in interviews—had been squeaky-clean, owing in part to his public dedication to his various social, political, humanitarian, and dietary interests that were not always popular in the 1980s. As a result, his death elicited a vast amount of coverage from the media. Phoenix was described by one writer as "the vegan James Dean", and comparisons were made regarding the youth and sudden deaths of both actors.

Phoenix was cremated and his ashes were scattered at the family ranch in Micanopy, Florida.

Legacy
Actors who have credited Phoenix as a major influence as well as paving the way for them include Leonardo DiCaprio, Jared Leto, James Franco, and many more.

During his acceptance speech for Best Actor at the 92nd Academy Awards, Joaquin Phoenix honored his brother by stating "When he was 17, my brother [River] wrote this lyric. He said: 'run to the rescue with love and peace will follow. Joaquin and partner Rooney Mara named their son, River, after him.

In culture and media
Phoenix's status as a teen idol and promising young actor, and his subsequent premature death, made him a frequent subject in popular culture media. He first gained references in music with Brazilian singer Milton Nascimento writing the song "River Phoenix: Letter to a Young Actor" about him after having seen Phoenix in The Mosquito Coast (1986). The song appears on the 1989 release Miltons.

Gus Van Sant, with whom Phoenix worked in the film My Own Private Idaho, dedicated his 1993 movie Even Cowgirls Get the Blues as well as his 1997 novel Pink to him. Experimental Santa Cruz filmmaker Cam Archer also produced a documentary called Drowning River Phoenix as part of his American Fame series.

Phoenix was the subject of a controversial song by Australian group TISM titled "(He'll Never Be An) Ol' Man River" the single originally featured a mock-up of Phoenix's tombstone as its cover art in 1995. The chorus features the line, "I'm on the drug that killed River Phoenix."

A lesser-known reference to River Phoenix was Final Fantasy VIII main protagonist Squall Leonhart. Tetsuya Nomura, the lead character designer for the game, stated he modeled Squall on River's visage during development, and even gave Squall the same birthdate. The scene of Phoenix's death also merits several mentions in William Gibson's book Spook Country.

Rapper Tyler, the Creator references Phoenix in his 2017's Flower Boy, perceived by some critics as a kind of coming out album, as a sex symbol. In the song "I Ain't Got Time", he writes in the first verses "Boy, I need a Kleenex. How I got this far? Boy, I can't believe it. That I got this car, so I take the scenic. Passenger a white boy, look like River Phoenix".

In July 2020, it was reported that Phoenix heavily influenced the forthcoming novel by British novelist Guy Mankowski, Dead Rock Stars, in which a character is named after him.

In "River", a song from Tigerlily, Natalie Merchant defends Phoenix as she castigates the media for systematically dissecting the child actor after his death.

Belinda Carlisle's 1996 song "California" refers to Phoenix's death: "I remember I was in the tanning salon / When I heard that River Phoenix was gone / They say that only the good die young / But that ain't true where I come from / California, California."

Honors and rankings
Phoenix has been ranked numerous times on a number of lists recognizing his talent and career. He was listed as one of twelve "Promising New Actors of 1986" in "John Willis' Screen World" (2004). Phoenix was voted at No. 64 on a "Greatest Movie Stars of All Time" poll by Channel 4 television in the UK. The poll was made up wholly of votes from prominent figures of the acting and directing communities. He was ranked No. 86 in Empire magazine's "The Top 100 Movie Stars of All Time" list in 1997.

His life and death has been the subject of an E! True Hollywood Story, an A&E Biography and an episode of Final 24, which contains a dramatic reconstruction of his final hours and death. He was also referred to as "This century's James Dean" in episode 10 ("Mi Casa, Su Casa Loma") of the first season of Being Erica. His death was listed as No. 16 in the top 101 events in E! Television's "101 Most Shocking Moments in Entertainment". In 2010, Phoenix was voted by GQ magazine as one of the "50 Most Stylish Men of the Past Half Century".

Filmography

Film

Television

Music videos

See also
 List of oldest and youngest Academy Award winners and nominees – Youngest nominees for Best Actor in a Supporting Role
List of actors with Academy Award nominations
List of Jewish Academy Award winners and nominees
List of animal rights advocates
List of vegans

References

Further reading
 
 
 Holmstrom, John. The Moving Picture Boy: An International Encyclopaedia from 1895 to 1995. Norwich, Michael Russell, 1996.

External links

 
 
 

1970 births
1993 deaths
Accidental deaths in California
Cocaine-related deaths in California
Drug-related deaths in California
20th-century American guitarists
20th-century American male actors
20th-century American male singers
20th-century American singers
Aleka's Attic members
Alternative rock guitarists
Alternative rock singers
American alternative rock musicians
American animal rights activists
American child models
American environmentalists
American male child actors
American male film actors
American male guitarists
American male singer-songwriters
American male television actors
American people of English descent
American people of French descent
American people of German descent
American people of Hungarian-Jewish descent
American people of Russian-Jewish descent
American political activists
American rock singers
American rock songwriters
American street performers
Deaths by heroin overdose in California
Guitarists from Florida
Guitarists from Oregon
Incidents of violence against boys
Independent Spirit Award for Best Male Lead winners
Male actors from Florida
Male actors from Gainesville, Florida
Male actors from Oregon
Male models from Oregon
Musicians from Gainesville, Florida
People from Madras, Oregon
People from Micanopy, Florida
River
Rape of males
Singer-songwriters from Oregon
Singer-songwriters from Florida
Volpi Cup for Best Actor winners
Actors with dyslexia